Frances Goodrich (December 21, 1890 – January 29, 1984) was an American actress, dramatist, and screenwriter, best known for her collaborations with her partner and husband Albert Hackett. She received the Pulitzer Prize for Drama with her husband in 1956 for The Diary of Anne Frank which had premiered the previous year.

Personal life
Goodrich was born in Belleville, New Jersey, the daughter of Madeleine Christy (née Lloyd) and Henry Wickes Goodrich. The family moved to nearby Nutley, New Jersey when Goodrich was two. She attended Collegiate School in Passaic, New Jersey, and graduated from Vassar College in 1912, and attended the New York School of Social Work from 1912 to 1913. She married actor Robert Ames in 1917 (divorced 1923), writer Hendrik Willem van Loon in 1927 (divorced 1930), and writer Albert Hackett in 1931. Goodrich and Hackett remained married until she died. Goodrich was Jewish.

Muckraking writer Henry Demarest Lloyd was Goodrich's uncle.

Career
Soon after she left the New York School of Social Work, Goodrich began the acting portion of her career at the Players Club in New York City. From there she went to Northampton, Massachusetts, where she acted in stock theater. Her acting credits on Broadway included Perkins (1918), Daddy Long Legs (1918), Fashions for Men (1922), Queen Victoria (1923), A Good Bad Woman (1925), Skin Deep (1927), and Excess Baggage (1927).

Not long after marrying Hackett, the couple settled in Hollywood in the late 1920s to write the screenplay for their stage success Up Pops the Devil for Paramount Pictures. In 1933, they signed a contract with MGM and remained with them until 1939. Among their early assignments was writing the screenplay for The Thin Man (1934). They were encouraged by director W.S. Van Dyke to use the writing of Dashiell Hammett as a basis only and to concentrate on providing witty exchanges for the principal characters, Nick and Nora Charles (played by William Powell and Myrna Loy). The resulting film was one of the major hits of the year, and the script was considered to show a modern relationship in a realistic manner for the first time.

The couple received Academy Award for Screenplay nominations for The Thin Man, After the Thin Man (1936), Father of the Bride (1950) and Seven Brides for Seven Brothers (1955). They won Writers Guild of America awards for Easter Parade (1949), Father's Little Dividend (1951), Seven Brides for Seven Brothers (1954), and The Diary of Anne Frank (1959), as well as nominations for In the Good Old Summertime (1949), Father of the Bride (1950) and The Long, Long Trailer (1954). They also won a Pulitzer Prize for Drama for their play The Diary of Anne Frank. Some of their other films include: Another Thin Man (1939) and It's a Wonderful Life (1946).

Death
Goodrich died from lung cancer on January 29, 1984, at the age of 93 in New York City.

References

External links 
 
 
 

1890 births
1984 deaths
American women screenwriters
Deaths from lung cancer in New York (state)
People from Belleville, New Jersey
People from Nutley, New Jersey
Pulitzer Prize for Drama winners
Vassar College alumni
Columbia University School of Social Work alumni
American women dramatists and playwrights
20th-century American dramatists and playwrights
20th-century American women writers
Screenwriters from New Jersey
Tony Award winners
Jewish American screenwriters
20th-century American screenwriters
20th-century American Jews
20th-century American actresses
American stage actresses
Broadway theatre people